Baía Farta is a town and municipality in Benguela Province in Angola. The municipality had a population of 107,841 in 2014.

See also
List of lighthouses in Angola

References

Populated places in Benguela Province
Municipalities of Angola
Lighthouses in Angola